Chase Seiffert (born August 12, 1991) is an American professional golfer.

Seiffert played college golf at Florida State University, where he was a two-time All-ACC selection.

As an amateur, Seiffert became the first person in the history of the Florida State Golf Association to ever capture their triple crown; the Amateur, the Florida Open and the Amateur Match Play Championships all in the same year.

During the 2016–17 season, Seiffert played three PGA Tour events by Monday qualifying. He Monday qualified for the 2018 Travelers Championship and finished T-9. In addition to winning $189,000, the finish generated enough non-member FedEx Cup points for him qualify for the 2018 Web.com Tour Finals. In the finals he finished 37th on the money list, earning him full status on the Web.com Tour for the 2019 season. In his rookie year, he finished the regular season 15th on the money list, earning a promotion to the PGA Tour for the 2019–20 season.

Amateur wins
2011 Liz Kling Spring Invitational, Region XXII Championship
2012 Florida Amateur, Florida Amateur Match Play

Professional wins
2012 Florida Open (as an amateur)

Results in major championships

CUT = missed the half-way cut

See also
2019 Korn Ferry Tour Finals graduates

References

External links

American male golfers
Florida State Seminoles men's golfers
PGA Tour golfers
Korn Ferry Tour graduates
Golfers from Florida
1991 births
Living people